Peter Artner (born 20 May 1966) is an Austrian former professional footballer who played as a defender.

Club career
Born in Vienna, Artner started his professional career with Austria Wien where he was the supposed successor of club legend Robert Sara. After a season on loan to First Vienna, he was however deemed surplus to requirements at Austria so he signed for Admira Wacker where he would spend six years before enjoying considerable success at Austria Salzburg.
 He played in both legs of the 1994 UEFA Cup Final which they lost to Inter Milan.

After indifferent spells in Spain and the Italian Serie B he returned to Austria to finish his career with the Sankt Pölten side.

International career
Artner made his debut for Austria in November 1987 against Romania and was a participant at the 1990 FIFA World Cup, where he was sent off in Austria's first round victory over the United States. He earned 55 caps, scoring one goal. His last international was a May 1996 friendly match against the Czech Republic.

Career statistics
Scores and results list Austria's goal tally first, score column indicates score after each Artner goal.

Honours
Wüstenrot Salzburg
 Austrian Football Bundesliga: 1994, 1995

Austria Wien
 Austrian Cup: 1986

External links
 Player profile - Austria Archiv

References

1966 births
Living people
Footballers from Vienna
Austrian footballers
Association football defenders
Austria international footballers
1990 FIFA World Cup players
FK Austria Wien players
First Vienna FC players
FC Admira Wacker Mödling players
FC Red Bull Salzburg players
Hércules CF players
Calcio Foggia 1920 players
SKN St. Pölten players
Austrian Football Bundesliga players
La Liga players
Serie B players
Austrian expatriate footballers
Austrian expatriate sportspeople in Spain
Expatriate footballers in Spain
Austrian expatriate sportspeople in Italy
Expatriate footballers in Italy